Viktor Hurniak (8 June 1987 – 19 October 2014), also known by the nicknames Gart, Gartik, or Oligarch, was a Ukrainian volunteer fighter in the War in Donbass. He also worked as a photographer for publications such as UNIAN, Reuters and the Ukrainian publication Insider. He was killed on 19 October 2014 as a result of a wound sustained from a mortar shell.

Biography

Education 
Viktor attended public school #27 in Ternopil, then the Technical College of the Ternopil Ivan Pul'uj National Technical University.

Work 
He worked for the Ternopil newspaper 20 minutes, edited a Plast periodical The Blossom of Ukraine (Цвіт України). Headed a Youth Civic Organization "Foundation for Regional Initiatives" and worked as a press secretary for the Ternopil chapter of the political party "PORA".

Family 
Viktor lived in Lviv with his wife Iryna and his daughter Yustyna.

Scouting 
Viktor joined Plast at the age of 14. He belonged to a group "Grey Wolves", which was part of the troop #29 named after Yuriy Starosolskyi. In 2004, he became one of the co-founders and the first troop leader of the troop #77 named after Ivan Havdyda. Later, he joined the "Order of the Iron Spur" Plast fraternity named after Sviatoslav the Conqueror.

Led a scout group "Eagles". Served as Deputy Head for Educational Programs in local (municipal level) and district (regional level) Plast chapters. Directed the communications division of the Ternopil chapter. Organized numerous events and activities, and served as the commander-in-charge of the national (all-Ukrainian) camp "Legion-11".

Anti-terrorist operation 
In the last several months of his life, Viktor served first as a supply volunteer and later as a volunteer fighter in the "Aidar" battalion on the front lines of the War in Donbass. At first, Viktor helped collect funds, purchase and transport the necessary supplies and equipment to the fighters of "Aidar" and other battalions operating in the war zone. In the summer of 2014, he decided to join the ranks of "Aidar".

Viktor died at 10:10 a.m. on 19 October 2014 as a result of a wound sustained from a mortar shell. He came under fire while transporting the wounded troops to safety in the vicinity of checkpoint #32, near the village of Smile, Luhansk region.

Funeral 
On 21 October, Viktor's native city of Ternopil gave him a hero's farewell: hundreds of Ternopilians greeted the funeral caravan at the city limits, to escort Viktor to the building where he had lived for many years and pay their last respects. In the evening, a memorial service was held at the Cathedral of the Immaculate Conception of BVM.

On 22 October 2014, a memorial service was held at the Sts. Peter and Paul Church in the city of Lviv, after which Viktor was buried at the Lychakiv Cemetery, next to the Plast monument at the site of the Memorial to the Ukrainian Galician Army. Several thousand people came to Viktor's funeral.

Legacy 
The Plast leadership recognized his heroic deed by posthumously awarding Viktor the highest honor - Iron Cross "For meritorious deeds in the national liberation struggle for the Ukrainian state".

Viktor was also posthumously awarded the Order For Courage 3rd grade.

Ukrainian scouts from Ternopil organized sales of self-produced baked goods, arts and crafts, to raise funds for the family of their fallen friend.

On 30 November, a human rights initiative "Euromaidan SOS" announced the results of its "Volunteer prize", recognizing the work of activists in 10 nomination categories. Viktor Gurniak became a laureate in the category "Person of Light".

Creative endeavors

Photography 
Viktor became interested in photography as a child, when his father gave him a present of his first camera - FED-5 (ФЕД-5). Professionally, Viktor became a photographer in 2005, when his snapshots started appearing in various Ternopil newspapers. In 2007, while hiking in the Crimean mountains, he accidentally witnessed a big fire. His photos of that fire became TOP photos of the week, and for the first time were published in some of the most highly rated publications in Ukraine, including UNIAN. Since that time he started freelancing for this news agency, and since the flu epidemic in the fall of 2009 - for Reuters.

In 2013, Viktor and his photographer friends co-founded their own agency - LUFA. Also, since December 2013, Viktor also worked with the internet publication «Insider». In addition, he reported from the winter Euromaidan protests, and produced a series of photographs about the life of "Aidar" battalion fighters.

Film 

Viktor also participated in several productions of music videos and films as an actor.

 Music video of Tartak and Nichlava "Don't tell anyone" (2007), where he plays the role of a "partisan fighter in an embroidered shirt" that is killed in the battle of 1943 near Zahoriv protecting his homeland from the occupying forces. Many of his friends and journalists draw an analogy between this role and the last several months of Viktor's real life, when he (now in real life) had to protect his homeland from the occupying forces in the East of Ukraine.
 Documentary of Taras Khymych "Golden September. A Chronicle of Galicia 1939–1941" (2007), where he played an episodic role of a partisan fighter.
 Music video for "Tartak" frontman Sashko Polozhynskyi's song "My Knightly Cross" (written at the Plast camp "Legion" in 2008). Viktor directed the production (camera operator - Ivan Dovhanyk).

References

Sources 

 Viktor Gurniak died in ATO zone // «Pohliad», 19 October 2014
 Viktor Gurniak, photo correspondent and fighter from "Aidar", dies in Luhansk region // "Hromadske", 19 October 2014
 Photo correspondent for INSIDER died in ATO zone // INSIDER, 19 October 2014
 In a battle in Luhansk region, an Eagle scout Viktor Gurniak is killed // Plast website 19 October 2014
 Photo correspondent Viktor Gurniak is killed in Luhansk region // Telekrytyka, 19 October 2014
 Ukrainian photo correspondent and "Aidar" fighter Viktor Gurniak is killed in Luhansk region // UNIAN, 19 October 2014
 Photo correspondent Viktor Gurniak is killed in Luhansk region // Radio Liberty, 19 October 2014
 Ternopil native Viktor Gurniak is killed in ATO zone // "20 minutes", 19 October 2014
 In a battle near Shchastia, a Reuters photographer that voluntarily joined "Aidar" is killed // TSN, 19 October 2014
 Ukrainian journalist Viktor Gurniak is killed in ATO zone // "Channel 5", 19 October 2014
 Photographer Viktor Gurniak is killed in ATO zone // Newspaper "Day", 19 October 2014
 War takes life of another patriot, journalist Viktor Gurniak. Ternopil region mourns... // Ternopil Regional State Administration website, 19 October 2014
 Polozhynskyi mourns the fallen Reuters photographer that volunteered for "Aidar" // TSN, 20 October 2014
 Bloody ceasefire: Exclusive report from Bakhmutivka (the last minutes of the video contain the last interview of Viktor Gurniak.) // Program "Facts", ICTV, 20 October 2014
 Warrior of Good: Memory of Viktor Gurniak // "Ukrainian Truth. Life", 22 October 2014
 Lviv church unable to fit all who wanted to say goodbye to Viktor Gurniak // ZIK, 22 October 2014
 Viktor Gurniak found eternal peace at the UGA Memorial in Lviv // ZIK, 22 October 2014

1987 births
2014 deaths
People from Ternopil Oblast
Ukrainian photographers
Recipients of the Order of Gold Star (Ukraine)